Alsheyevsky District (Bashkir and , Älşäy rayonı) is an administrative and municipal district (raion), one of the fifty-four in the Republic of Bashkortostan, Russia. It is located in the west of the republic. Its administrative center is the rural locality (a selo) of Rayevsky. As of the 2010 Census, the total population of the district was 43,647, with the population of Rayevsky accounting for 44.8% of that number.

History
The district was established on January 31, 1935.

Administrative and municipal status
Within the framework of administrative divisions, Alsheyevsky District is one of the fifty-four in the Republic of Bashkortostan. The district is divided into 20 selsoviets, comprising 104 rural localities. As a municipal division, the district is incorporated as Alsheyevsky Municipal District. Its twenty selsoviets are incorporated as twenty rural settlements within the municipal district. The selo of Rayevsky serves as the administrative center of both the administrative and municipal district.

References

Notes

Sources

 
Districts of Bashkortostan
States and territories established in 1935